"Right On" is a song by American rapper Lil Baby. It was released a single through Quality Control Music and Motown on April 8, 2022, concurrently with another single, "In a Minute". The song was solely produced by ATL Jacob.

Credits and personnel
 Lil Baby – vocals, songwriting
 ATL Jacob – production, songwriting
 Thomas "Tillie" Mann – mixing
 Stephen "Dot Com" Farrow – mixing assistance
 Colin Leonard – mastering
 Matthew "Mattazik Musik" Robinson – recording
 Angie Randisi – recording

Charts

Weekly charts

Year-end charts

References

2022 singles
2022 songs
Lil Baby songs
Songs written by Lil Baby
Motown singles
Songs written by ATL Jacob